James Duncan Davidson is an American software developer and photographer. He's currently the Technology Advisor to Tobias Lütke, CEO of Shopify.

While a software engineer at Sun Microsystems (1997–2001), Davidson created Tomcat, a Java-based webserver application and the Ant Java-based build tool. Davidson is the author or co-author of several books on both using and writing software, including Learning Cocoa with Objective-C, Cocoa in a Nutshell, Running Mac OS X Panther, and Mac OS X Panther Hacks, all published by O’Reilly Media. He also contributed to Agile Web Development with Rails, published by The Pragmatic Programmers.

He was raised in Oklahoma and Texas, and is a resident of Berlin. Before he joined Shopify, he was a Principal Software Engineer and CTO in Residence at Microsoft for Startups. His work was to provide advice for startup founders and CTOs and help them prioritize, focus, and think through their work.

Starting in 2005, Duncan added photography to his other professional focuses.
He has served as the primary event photographer at several high-profile technology conferences. From 2009 to 2016 he was the main stage photographer for TED conferences, photographing every TED and TEDGlobal event. In 2010, Duncan was the photographer for the Mission Blue Voyage in the Galapagos Islands and led the TEDxOilSpill Expedition in the Gulf of Mexico. Davidson is also known for his artistic travel photos, often with an eye for architectural details, a clear reference to his university studies in architecture.

He was the co-founder and co-owner (along with Greg Koenig) of Luma Labs, a small company based in Portland, OR focused on making high quality camera accessories.

References

External links 

 Personal web site
 O'Reilly Author page; articles, links to books on Rails, Cocoa and Mac OS X
 Luma Labs
 Mission Blue at TED
 TEDxOilSpill Expedition

Living people
People from Lubbock, Texas
Photographers from Oregon
American computer programmers
Sun Microsystems people
Photographers from Berlin
Microsoft people
American expatriates in Germany
Year of birth missing (living people)